The Michigan State Spartans softball team represents Michigan State University in NCAA Division I college softball.  The team participates in the Big Ten Conference. The Spartans are currently led by head coach Sharonda McDonald-Kelley. The team plays its home games at Secchia Stadium located on the university's campus.

History

Coaching history

Championships

AIAW Women's College World Series National Championships

Conference tournament championships

Coaching staff

Awards
Big Ten Coach of the Year
Gloria Becksford, 1986
Jacquie Joseph, 2003

References

 
1972 establishments in Michigan
Sports clubs established in 1972